was a town located in Akumi District, Yamagata Prefecture, Japan.

As of 2003, the town had an estimated population of 7,114 and a density of 34.74 persons per km². The total area was 204.76 km².

On November 1, 2005, Yawata, along with the towns of Hirata and Matsuyama (all from Akumi District), was merged into the expanded city of Sakata.

External links
 Sakata official website 

Dissolved municipalities of Yamagata Prefecture
Sakata, Yamagata